Christabelle Borg (born 28 April 1992), sometimes known as simply Christabelle, is a Maltese singer, songwriter, and television presenter. She represented Malta in the Eurovision Song Contest 2018 in Lisbon, Portugal, with the song "Taboo", but failed to qualify to the final, finishing in 13th place with 101 points".

Early life
Borg was born on 1992 in Mġarr. She later studied music at Mount St. Mary's College, graduating in 2014. Afterwards, she studied accounting at the University of Malta and graduated with a Master's degree in 2015.

Career
Borg began her career as a teenager, hosting the Maltese television shows Teen Trouble and Teen Traffic. In 2005 she tried to represent Malta in the Junior Eurovision Song Contest 2005 with the song "Going wild". In 2014, Borg took part in Malta Eurovision Song Contest 2014 with the song "Lovetricity", placing eighth in the final. She returned to the competition in 2015 with the song "Rush" and 2016 with the song "Kingdom", placing second and fourth, respectively. 

In 2018, she returned to Malta Eurovision Song Contest for the fourth time with the song "Taboo", winning the competition. She represented Malta in the Eurovision Song Contest 2018 in Lisbon, Portugal.

Discography

Singles

References

External links

1992 births
University of Malta alumni
Eurovision Song Contest entrants of 2018
Living people
Eurovision Song Contest entrants for Malta
21st-century Maltese women singers
21st-century Maltese singers
Maltese pop singers
Maltese songwriters
Mount St. Mary's University (Los Angeles) alumni
People from Mġarr
Maltese women television presenters
English-language writers from Malta